Norman Brookes defeated Otto Froitzheim 6–2, 6–1, 5–7, 4–6, 8–6 in the All Comers' Final, and then defeated the reigning champion Anthony Wilding 6–4, 6–4, 7–5 in the challenge round to win the gentlemen's singles tennis title at the 1914 Wimbledon Championships. It would be the last Wimbledon tournament for five years due to World War I.

Draw

Challenge round

All-Comers' Finals

Top half

Section 1

Section 2

Section 3

Section 4

Bottom half

Section 5

Section 6

Section 7

Section 8

References

External links

Men's Singles
Wimbledon Championship by year – Men's singles